Katipunan, officially the Municipality of Katipunan (Subanen: Benwa Katipunan; Chavacano: Municipalidad de Katipunan), is a 2nd class municipality in the province of Zamboanga del Norte, Philippines. According to the 2020 census, it has a population of 44,661 people.

It is formerly known as Lubungan.

History
Jose Rizal, Philippine national hero, had a farm here during his exile in Dapitan from 1892-1896.
In 1955, six barrios were created:
 sitios of Malobog, Malupis, Linasan Manok, Gakol, Gimakan, Lipakan and Capasi as barrio Denoman;
 sitios of Boalboal, Malonglong, Lobongpre, Nanginan Upper, Larang, Lowang, Lawag, Sibog, Lindangan, Gumatob and Lumbayao as barrio Pinialan;
 sitios of Baoy, Tamara, Tamilokan, Labokan, Sinilog, Grap, Tobod, Larang, Senuelan, Sibutak, Kunalog, Sapanaga and Upper Lipoga as barrio Nanginan;
 sitios of Depog, Mate, Saloyong, Lanasan, Notap, Balangasan, Masoy, Upper Seraboc, Dapitan, Linay, Baoran, Bulaw, Siran, Kalayaw, Salay, Kalangag, Conon, Pinopoan, Dauwan, Takwas, Labob, Dabiac, Labaw, Diway, Toboy, Domala, Tolawan, Gotayan, Sirowan, Sigosoy, Dicayas, Kasaw, Denoman, Gimitan, Liliran, Sigamoc, Mosoman, Sikitan, Pierangan, Kitonoc, Parol, Karopay, Tokosawan, Nopiac, Ginokot, Lotowan, Logoc, Napangon, Gomanggay, Boyawan, Malonob, Dicayok, Silisi, Talisay, Tiyala, and Setog Proper as barrio Setog;
 sitios of Mamara, Tabenas, Kimay, Setubo, Diwakat, Sebalug, Liang, Balobohan, Libo, Sapa, Langob, Moliton, Lanapan, Calumbog and Bentunong as barrio Kanibongan; and
 sitios of Basangan, Tongilawan, Sikawang, Lagag, Singatong, Linabo, Luyoran and Palinan as barrio Basangan.

Geography

Climate

Barangays
Katipunan is politically subdivided into 30 barangays.

Demographics

Economy

Notable personalities

Adolfo Sevilla Azcuna (b. February 16, 1939) - Philippine Judicial Academy (PHILJA) Chancellor (since June 1, 2009) and the 153rd Associate Justice of the Supreme Court of the Philippines (October 24, 2002 – February 15, 2009).
Eddie Laure

See also
List of renamed cities and municipalities in the Philippines

References

External links
 Katipunan Profile at PhilAtlas.com
 [ Philippine Standard Geographic Code]
Philippine Census Information

Municipalities of Zamboanga del Norte